"Ascension (Don't Ever Wonder)  is a 1996 song by American R&B/neo soul singer Maxwell, released as the second single from his debut album, Maxwell's Urban Hang Suite. It peaked at number eight on the US Billboard R&B/Hip-Hop Songs chart, number 36 on the Billboard Hot 100 and number 28 on the UK Singles Chart.  The B side of the single is "Lock You Up N' Love Fa Days," which was previously unreleased and also written and produced by Musze.

Critical reception
Christopher A. Daniel from Albumism stated that the song "keeps the groove in motion". AllMusic editor Stephen Cook picked it as one of the highlights from Maxwell's Urban Hang Suite. Daryl Easlea for BBC said that it "was the rightful hit single". Larry Flick from Billboard wrote that it continues to revisit the classic soul ground first mined by legends like Marvin Gaye and Smokey Robinson. He noted that "cruising at a chilled midtempo pace, Maxwell flexes his voice to falsetto heights while also displaying a rich lower register that's so sexy. Wrap in a rubbery bassline and jiggly funk guitars and you have a tasty single". Monyca D. Coleman from Indianapolis Recorder deemed it as "brilliant". Pan-European magazine Music & Media stated that "it won't take long for the world to discover the Next Big Thing In Soul Music. Maxwell is quickly capturing hearts all over the world. He even got TAFKAP to do the sound of his recent Paris show. He oozes charisma and he has the musical clout to back it up. He glides his way through this mid-tempo smoothie with a delicious deep bass and wah wah guitars."

A reviewer from Music Week rated it three out of five, describing it as a "dreamy soul offering", that "could see him making inroads into the charts." Damien Mendis from the magazine's RM Dance Update praised the track, writing, "The class just oozes out of the speakers. He lays down sophisticated soul that will have purists gagging at the first four bars." He added, "So good it hurts." Bob Jones from Muzik said it is "the next best thing since soul was invented. Awesome, truly awesome!" Malaysian newspaper New Straits Times''' commented, "Forget about Viagra, this is the real thing! If ethereal tracks like Ascension, Whenever, Wherever and ...Til The Cops Keep Knockin' don't raise body temperatures, you're in serious "shagadelic" trouble my friend. Lights off, stimulus on!" San Antonio Express-News described it as "slinky". A writer for Vibe called it a "smooth" and "slow" track, with a "sultry mood".

Chart performance
"Ascension (Don't Ever Wonder)" debuted on the Billboard Hot R&B/Hip-Hop Singles & Tracks chart in the US in August 1996, at number 11, eventually peaking at number eight and spending 29 weeks on the chart. It also spent eighteen weeks on the Billboard'' Hot 100, peaking at number 36 on September 28, 1996. In Europe, the single reached the Top 30 in the UK, peaking at number 28 on the UK Singles Chart. But it was even more successful on the UK R&B Chart, peaking at number six. Additionally, it also charted in Scotland, reaching number 52.

Music video
The music video for the song was directed by American music video and television director and television producer Liz Friedlander. At the beginning, Maxwell stands alone, dancing in the dark in a room that is a large stage surrounded by white screens. As he begins to sing, the light slowly turns on the singer. He is dressed in a shiny gray outfit and a band is now performing around him on stage. Throughout the video, different people are entering the room through a large oval opening. Towards the end, these people are dancing among the musicians while Maxwell sings until the end of the video. The video for "Ascension (Don't Ever Wonder)" was later published on Maxwell's official YouTube channel in October 2009. It has amassed more than 52,2 million views as of October 2021.

Track listing

Charts and certifications

Weekly charts

Certifications

References

External links
 www.musze.com

1996 singles
Maxwell (musician) songs
1995 songs
Columbia Records singles
Songs written by Itaal Shur
Songs written by Maxwell (musician)
Music videos directed by Liz Friedlander